The following engagements took place in the year 1863 during the American Civil War. During the year, Union forces captured the Confederate cities of Vicksburg and Port Hudson, giving them complete control over the Mississippi River, while forcing Confederates out of the North following the Battle of Gettysburg.



History
In the Eastern theater, the Union Army of the Potomac, commanded by Major General Joseph Hooker, attacked the Confederate Army of Northern Virginia commanded by General Robert E. Lee in the Battle of Chancellorsville. Hooker planned to move most of his army around to the Confederates's rear before Lee could react and force Lee to retreat but the Union army was slowed and then stopped by a small Confederate force, which was reinforced by the rest of the Confederate army. Lee then sent a flanking column led by Thomas J. Jackson around Hooker's left, which attacked a few hours before sunset on May 2; this attack and further Confederate attacks the following day forced Hooker to retreat on May 6. During the battle, Jackson was wounded by friendly fire and died several days later. Lee reorganized his army following the campaign and launched an invasion of Union territory in June, moving through the Shenandoah Valley into Pennsylvania; Hooker was relieved of command on June 29, due to continuous disputes with the government over the garrison of Harpers Ferry, and replaced by Major General George Meade. During the Battle of Gettysburg from July 1 to July 3, Meade successfully held off Lee's attacks while inflicting heavy casualties in return. Lee was forced to retreat back to Virginia; Meade followed in close pursuit but was unable to find an opportunity to completely crush the Confederate army. In October, Lee attempted to isolate and destroy Meade during the Bristoe Campaign but failed in an attack on Union positions at the Battle of Bristoe Station on October 14. Pressed by Union authorities, Meade also tried to attack Lee's positions along the Mine Run; however, Lee was able to establish a fortified defensive line across the Union line of advance. Meade judged the Confederate position too strong to attack and retreated.

 
In the Western Theater, simultaneous Union offensives from northern Mississippi and eastern Louisiana resulted in the sieges of Vicksburg and Port Hudson, both along the Mississippi River. Ulysses S. Grant started the Vicksburg campaign near the end of April when he crossed the Mississippi River near Bruinsburg Landing, south of Grand Gulf. He then marched inland and captured the Mississippi state capital of Jackson before turning east to Vicksburg; this isolated the Confederate garrison from Confederate supplies and reinforcements. After a six-week siege, the Confederate garrison surrendered on July 4,  followed by the surrender of Port Hudson on July 9; this resulted in the complete Union control of the Mississippi River and made Grant a hero in the North. In central Tennessee, the Union Army of the Cumberland commanded by Major General William S. Rosecrans maneuvered the Confederate Army of Tennessee, commanded by General Braxton Bragg, towards Chattanooga, Tennessee during the Tullahoma Campaign from late June to early July. In early September, Rosecrans launched another offensive which resulted in the capture of Chattanooga, an important Confederate rail center; however, a few weeks later Bragg, reinforced with James Longstreet's corps from the Army of Northern Virginia, attacked Rosecrans near the Chickamauga Creek and routed much of the Union army, forcing it to retreat back to Chattanooga. Stubborn resistance from the troops of George H. Thomas prevented the Confederates from launching an immediate pursuit. Bragg settled his army into a siege of Chattanooga, almost completely cutting off all supplies to the Union army. Soon, dissension and arguments began to create tension in the Confederate army's high command; this resulted in Longstreet being sent to eastern Tennessee and a reorganization of the army in an attempt by Bragg to rid the army of his critics. Grant, promoted to command of the Military Division of the Mississippi, took command of the Union forces near the city, which was reinforced by the Army of the Tennessee and a detachment from the Army of the Potomac. During the three days from November 23 to the 26, Grant launched a series of attacks on the Confederate positions and was able to drive off Bragg's army. A rear guard action by Patrick Cleaburne at Ringgold Gap halted the Union pursuit long enough for Bragg to reach safety. A few weeks after the battle, Bragg was relieved of command by his own request.
 

In the Trans-Mississippi Theater, only small battles and skirmishes took place. On January 1, Confederate forces led by Major General John B. Magruder recaptured the port city of Galveston, the only port city which the Confederates were able to recapture during the war. In order to cut off the Trans-Mississippi supply lines to Port Hudson, Major General Nathaniel P. Banks moved up the Bayou Teche in Louisiana during April. For the remainder of the summer, Confederate commander Major General Richard Taylor attempted to cut off Banks' supply lines to New Orleans but failed. In September, Union forces tried to invade eastern Texas to counteract the French invasion of Mexico but were defeated at Sabine Pass, losing two gunboats and 350 men while the Confederates suffered no casualties.

Engagements

See also

 Mississippi River campaigns in the American Civil War

References

Sources
 Castel, Albert. Civil War Kansas: Reaping the Whirlwind. Lawrence, Kansas: University Press of Kansas, 1997. .
 Chaitin, Peter M. The Coastal War: Chesapeake Bay to Rio Grande. Alexandria, Virginia: Time-Life Books, 1984. .
 Cozzens, Peter. This Terrible Sound: The Battle of Chickamauga. Urbanna, Illinois: University of Illinois Press, 1992. .
 Crew, Vernon H. "The Thomas Legion", in Civil War Times Illustrated, Vol. X, no. 3 (June 1971), pp. 40–45. 
 Hurst, Jack. Nathan Bedford Forrest: A Biography. New York: Alfred A. Knopf, 1993. .
 Josephy, Jr., Alvin M. The Civil War in the American West. New York: Alfred A. Knopf, 1991. .
 Kennedy, Frances H. The Civil War Battlefield Guide, 2nd edition. New York: Houghton Mifflin, 1998. .
 Longacre, Edward. The Cavalry at Gettysburg: A Tactical Study of Mounted Operations during the Civil War's Pivotal Campaign, 9 June – 14 July 1863. Lincoln, Nebraska: University of Nebraska Press, 1993. .
 Nye, Wilbur Sturtevant. Here Come the Rebels! Dayton, Ohio: Morningside Bookshop, 1988. 
 Parrish, T. Michael. Richard Taylor: Soldier Prince of Dixie. Chapel Hill, North Carolina: University of North Carolina Press, 1992. 
 Sears, Stephen W. Chancellorsville. New York: Mariner Books, 1996. 
 Sears, Stephen W. Gettysburg. New York: Houghton Mifflin, 2003. .
 Sheppard, Jonathan C. By the Noble and Daring of Her Sons: The Florida Brigade of the Army of Tennessee. Tuscaloosa, Alabama: University of Alabama Press, 2012. .
 Wert, Jeffry D. General James Longstreet: The Confederacy's Most Controversial Soldier – A Biography. New York: Simon & Schuster, 1993. 
 Wittenberg, Eric J., J. David Petruzzi, and Michael F. Nugent. One Continuous Fight: The Retreat from Gettysburg and the Pursuit of Lee's Army of Northern Virginia, July 4th–14th, 1863. New York: Savas Beatie, 2008. .

1863 in the United States
American Civil War timelines
Battles of the American Civil War
Battles 1863